Carvalhoa is a genus of plants in the family Apocynaceae first described as a genus in 1895. It is native to tropical Africa.

Species
 Carvalhoa campanulata K.Schum. - Mozambique
 Carvalhoa macrophylla K.Schum. - Kenya, Mozambique, Tanzania, Malawi, Zambia

References

Apocynaceae genera
Rauvolfioideae